The following is a list of FCC-licensed radio stations in the U.S. state of Arkansas, which can be sorted by their call signs, frequencies, cities of license, licensees, and programming formats. NOAA Weather Radio stations are not listed.

List of radio stations

Defunct
 KAMD-AM
 KAPZ
 KAWX-LP
 KBHC
 KBRI
 KBRS
 KCCL
 KCLA
 KCON
 KDDA
 KDEW
 KENB-LP
 KESP
 KGED
 KGPL
 KHAM
 KHBR-LP
 KHEE-LP
 KGKO
 KJQS
 KKIP
 KLCN
 KLRG (1450 AM) 
 KMOA
 KOKY
 KOTN
 KPBA (1270 AM)
 KPBQ-FM
 KPCA
 KPJN-LP
 KPWH-LP
 KRKD
 KRMN
 KSIP
 KSRB
 KSSP
 KSYP
 KTPA
 KTPV-LP
 KUEC
 KVSA
 KXKY
 KXXA
 KYDE
 KZHS
 KZOT
 KZTD
 KZYP
 KZYQ
 WETI

See also
 Arkansas media
 List of newspapers in Arkansas
 List of television stations in Arkansas
 Media of cities in Arkansas: Fayetteville, Fort Smith, Hot Springs, Little Rock, Rogers

References

Bibliography

External links

  (Directory ceased in 2017)
 Arkansas Broadcasters Association

Images

 
Arkansas
Radio stations